The Kitlope River is a river in the Kitimat Ranges in the North Coast of British Columbia, Canada, flowing north for , into the head of the Gardner Canal to the south of the smelter town of Kitimat. It is named for the Gitlope group of Haisla, now part of the Haisla Nation government and community at Kitamaat Village near Kitimat.  The name is a Tsimshian language reference to the people, who call themselves Henaksiala, and means "people of the rocks" or "people of the opening in the mountains".  The Haisla language name for the river is Xesduwaxwsdu.

The term "the Kitlope" may refer also to the basin of the Kitlope, including the basins of its tributaries.  The area has been the scene of protracted conservationist vs. resource extraction controversy since the 1970s and is now the Kitlope Heritage Conservancy, a protected area managed by BC Parks.

The Kitlope Indian Reserve No. 16 is located at the river's mouth.

Tributaries
Tsaytis River (C'itis in Haisla) - joins the Kitlope at its estuary
Kalitan Creek (Tlasudis in Haisla) - joins the Kitlope via the Tezwa
Tezwa River (Wa'yuwa in Haisla) - joins the Kitlope via Kitlope Lake
Gamsby River 
Tnaiko Creek (Daniko in Haisla; the Tenaiko is tributary to the Gamsby - note also Tenaiko Range) 
Kapella River  (Qapela'ax in Haisla)

See also
Khutzeymateen Grizzly Bear Sanctuary
Great Bear Rainforest
Kitlope (disambiguation)
List of rivers in British Columbia

References

Rivers of the North Coast of British Columbia
Rivers of the Kitimat Ranges